The 2nd Lambda Literary Awards were held in 1990 to honour works of LGBT literature published in 1989.

Special awards

Recipients

External links
 2nd Lambda Literary Awards

02
Lambda
Lists of LGBT-related award winners and nominees
1990 in LGBT history
1990 awards in the United States